N.E.R.D. (stylized as N⋆E⋆R⋆D and N.E.R.D, a backronym of No-one Ever Really Dies) is an American hip hop and rock band, formed in Virginia Beach, Virginia, in 1999. Pharrell Williams and Chad Hugo were signed by Teddy Riley to Virgin Records as a duo, The Neptunes. After producing songs for several artists throughout the late 1990s, the duo formed the band with Shay Haley as a side project of The Neptunes in 1999. N.E.R.D.'s debut album, In Search Of..., sold 603,000 copies in the United States and was certified Gold by the Recording Industry Association of America (RIAA). It was also awarded the second annual Shortlist Music Prize. The band's second album, Fly or Die, sold 412,000 copies in the United States, but shipped at least 500,000 units, certifying it Gold.

In 2005, N.E.R.D. ended their contract with Virgin and disbanded. Three years later, the band reunited under Star Trak Entertainment, a subsidiary of Interscope Records established by Williams and Hugo. The band's third album, Seeing Sounds, released in 2008, sold just under 80,000 copies in its first week. The album was followed by Nothing, which was released in 2010.

N.E.R.D. then began promotion in October 2017 after a period of silence following their 2010 album, which made fans speculate that the group had a new album or project in the works. Their new album was titled No One Ever Really Dies, explaining their initial advertisements and confirming the rumors of fans. The group released the first single for the album, "Lemon", in early November. Released in December 2017, the album has collaborations with multiple artists, including Kendrick Lamar, André 3000, M.I.A., Future, Wale, Gucci Mane, Rihanna, and Ed Sheeran.

History

Formation and early career
Pharrell Williams and Chad Hugo met at the age of 12 at a band class in Virginia Beach. Hugo was the Drum Major for the Kempsville High School Marching Chiefs, under the direction of current University of Virginia Band Director, William Pease, while Pharrell was a drumline member of the (FMC) The Fabulous Marching Cavaliers of Princess Anne High School, both of Virginia Beach, Virginia. They spent their free time making beats and performing in groups with fellow childhood friend Timbaland. Williams and Hugo met Shay Haley in high school and began performing together. The trio often met in Hugo's garage, where he beatboxed through a speaker system while Haley danced. After watching the duo perform at a high school talent show, Teddy Riley, a musician and producer, signed Williams and Hugo in 1992. After producing songs for several artists throughout the late 1990s and early 2000s, the production duo formed N.E.R.D in 1999 as a side project known for their appearance on Ghetto Children off Kelis' debut Kaleidoscope.

2001–2002: In Search Of...
The band's debut album, In Search Of..., was released in Europe in September 2001. Williams and Hugo used similar digital production techniques as they did for other artists. However, the band decided that they wanted to sound different from their previous work. This led them to rerecording the album using live instruments with rock band Spymob for a worldwide release in 2002. The album debuted at number 61 on the Billboard 200 and peaked at number 56. It failed to replicate the success of The Neptunes' previous productions. The album won the second annual Shortlist Music Prize, an accolade awarded to albums released in the United States that have not achieved mainstream success and have sales of 500,000 copies or less at the time of nomination. The album sold 603,000 copies in the United States and was certified Gold by the RIAA. The album's lead single, "Lapdance", peaked at number 36 of the Hot Rap Tracks chart and number 85 on the Hot R&B/Hip-Hop Songs. The second single, "Rock Star", peaked at number 36 on the Billboard Hot Modern Rock Tracks chart. A 6.1 surround mix of this album was released by DTS Entertainment on a DVD-Audio disc in 2005. The original version of the album is a collectors' item.

2003–2004: Fly or Die

The band recorded its second album, Fly or Die, in 2003. They learned to play the songs live, as Chad Hugo told MTV News on December 9, 2003: "We're the ones playing the instruments live this time. I just started playing guitar last year so I'm learning as we go. Pharrell's playing drums. [Last time] we didn't have time to learn certain instruments so we got Spymob to help us out."

Fly or Die was released in March 2004. The album debuted at number six on the Billboard 200, selling 119,000 copies in its first week. The album sold 412,000 copies in the United States and was certified Gold by the RIAA. The first single, "She Wants to Move", has gone top 5 in the United Kingdom, top 20 in Norway, Ireland, and Denmark, and top 40 in Australia and the Netherlands. The music videos for "She Wants to Move" and its follow-up single, "Maybe", have received strong support from the digital cable network VH1 Soul in America.

2005–2008: Hiatus and Seeing Sounds
In 2005, N.E.R.D ended their contract with Virgin Records over a label dispute and the band disbanded. While touring, the band became "hooked" on the energy from their fans, which led them to begin recording their third studio album, spending their own money while still unsigned. Williams and Hugo later established Star Trak Entertainment, a subsidiary of Interscope Records. In March 2008, the band performed at South by Southwest in Austin, Texas. While there they filmed a PSA for Rock the Vote saying why they thought voting was important and the issues they cared about that election year.

From April to June 2008, the band toured with Kanye West as an opening act along with Rihanna and Lupe Fiasco as part of the Glow in the Dark Tour. On June 13, they gave an energetic performance at the Isle of Wight festival, however they almost missed their scheduled show because they didn't know where the island was. On June 25, they performed in front of 40,000 people at the Isle of MTV 2008 at the Floriana granaries, Malta with free admission.
On August 9, 2008, the band played at the Way Out West music festival held in the city park of Gothenburg, Sweden. In September 2008, N.E.R.D performed to a sold-out crowd at the House of Blues in Chicago, and brought special guest Bad Brains onstage. N.E.R.D released their third studio album, Seeing Sounds in June 2008. The first single off the album, titled "Everyone Nose (All the Girls Standing in the Line for the Bathroom)", was first mentioned on their Billionaire Boys Club blog in January 2008. The second single off the album, titled "Spaz", was used in a TV commercial for the Microsoft Zune. The group toured with American rock band, Linkin Park on the European leg of their Projekt Revolution tour in 2008 with artists like HIM, The Used and Jay-Z. The group also played at the National Bowl, Milton Keynes before the recording of Road to Revolution by Linkin Park.

2009–present: Nothing and No One Ever Really Dies
In 2009, a song entitled "Soldier" featuring Santigold and Lil Wayne was featured on the soundtrack of the teen drama 90210. In 2010, N.E.R.D announced the release of their fourth studio album entitled Nothing, which had a scheduled release date for September 7, 2010, but was pushed back to November 2, 2010. The first single from the album, "Hot-n-Fun" featuring Canadian recording artist Nelly Furtado, was released on May 18, 2010, on iTunes. It was released in the United Kingdom on August 30, 2010. On August 20, 2010, a track titled "Party People" leaked onto the internet. It was rumored to be the second single from the album. On September 28, 2010, they premiered another track from the album titled "Hypnotize U" on Late Show with David Letterman, produced by electronic music duo Daft Punk. On September 30, 2010, in an interview with Mark Hoppus on A Different Spin with Mark Hoppus, Pharrell explained the album cover as "a mix of so many things. The feathers represent the peace, and the helmet represents the war. It's like where we are right now. There's a lot of war, that people can't necessarily explain. The economy sucks, girls are still beautiful. We wanted to make music that reflected that. So people can look back twenty years from now, and say 'this is what was going on'". They then announced in the interview that the next two singles would be "I've Seen the Light" and "Hypnotize U". Pharrell described "Hypnotize U" as being "so different from the rest of the album", stating he was "very pleased because it serves a different purpose" in the album. On October 17, 2010, the standard edition and the deluxe edition of the album became available for pre-order on iTunes. It was later announced that they would support Gorillaz on the North American leg of their 2010 'Escape to Plastic Beach' world tour. In 2013, Pharrell confirmed a N.E.R.D album was in progress, but also mentioned that the album would not be released that year due to the projects he was working on with other artists. He has also said the album will be "nature-based". The group reunited on December 26, 2014, to release the songs "Squeeze Me," "Patrick Star," and "Sandy Squirrel" for the film The SpongeBob Movie: Sponge Out of Water.

N.E.R.D's fifth album, No One Ever Really Dies, was released on December 15, 2017, through i am OTHER and Columbia Records. It features guest appearances from André 3000, M.I.A., Gucci Mane, Wale, and Ed Sheeran among others. It was preceded by three singles; "Lemon" with Rihanna (on November 1), "1000" with Future (on November 29), and "Don't Don't Do It!" with Kendrick Lamar (on December 13).

Musical style
The band's sound generally contains elements of rock, funk and hip hop, while also encompassing R&B and pop. Their sound has also been described as featuring alternative hip hop, funk rock, rap rock, experimental hip hop, avant-funk, and progressive pop. They have been praised for their heavy use of electronic, bass and funk beats, while others have suggested that The Neptunes are unable to blend R&B and rock.

N.E.R.D's lyrics have been criticized. Ian Cohen of Pitchfork called the band's lyrical writing ability "far down the list of what N.E.R.D is actually good at", where Williams is often criticized for being excessively sexual. With the release of Fly or Die, the album was advertised in Kerrang! magazine, which made Alexis Petridis of The Guardian feel that N.E.R.D's lyrics tried to "empathize with the alienated teenagers who make up Kerrang!s readership".

Band members
 Pharrell Williams – lead vocals, piano, keyboards, drums, percussion, programming
 Chad Hugo – guitars, piano, keyboards, saxophone, bass guitar, programming, backing vocals
 Shay Haley – drums, percussion, backing vocals

Touring members
 Thaddaeus Tribbett - bass guitar
 James Darrell Robinson - drums, percussion
 Junius Bervine - keyboards
 Brent Paschke - guitars

 (Paschke was also the lead guitarist for rock band Spymob and the entire band made live instrumentations for the N.E.R.D.'s first 3 studio albums, In Search Of... (2001-2002),  Fly or Die (2004), and Seeing Sounds (2008). They also toured with them before from 2001 to 2008.)

Male dancers
 Eddie Eskridge
 Jesse Sanchez
 Angelo Saunders

Female dancers
 Mette Towley (lead dancer in "Lemon (ft. Rihanna)")
 Kenitia Coleman
 Natsuki Miya

Discography

Studio albums

Singles

Notes

Other appearances

Notes

References

 
 "Sprite Fresh Sound Studio Live Performance with N.E.R.D." November 1, 2010 Buzznet Media

External links

 Official N.E.R.D website

N.E.R.D.
American hip hop groups
Alternative hip hop groups
Funk rock musical groups
Winners of the Shortlist Music Prize
Musical groups established in 1999
Pharrell Williams
The Neptunes
Virgin Records artists
Interscope Records artists
1999 establishments in Virginia